Touch the Truck was a British Channel 5 endurance gameshow which aired in March 2001. It was hosted by Dale Winton and involved a group of 20 contestants holding onto a stationary truck. The last person left touching the truck — a Toyota Land Cruiser Amazon — won it.

The show was filmed at the Lakeside Shopping Centre in Thurrock, Essex.

Jerry Middleton, 39, from Winchester, Hampshire, was the winner who managed to stay awake touching the vehicle for 81 hours 43 minutes and 31 seconds. He stated that he was going to sell the vehicle to fund a political party. Middleton stood at the 2001 General Election in the Kingston and Surbiton constituency, but gained only 54 votes of a turnout of 49,093.

Rules
According to the rules of the competition, disqualification occurred when:

a contestant overran breaks which were 10 minutes every two hours, and 15 minutes every six hours,
a contestant removed both hands from the truck, or
a contestant fell asleep.

The format
The format was devised by Glenn Barden and Dave Hills and is owned by Vashca. It has been subsequently licensed to the Philippines, Indonesia, Portugal and Turkey.

In popular culture
The show played a significant part in the second episode of Diane Morgan's 2020 BBC sitcom Mandy.

See also
 Hands on a Hard Body: The Documentary

References

External links
 Vashca
 
 

2001 British television series debuts
2001 British television series endings
2000s British game shows
Channel 5 (British TV channel) original programming
English-language television shows